
This is a list of players who graduated from the Challenge Tour in 2005. The top 20 players on the Challenge Tour's money list in 2005 earned their European Tour card for 2006.

* European Tour rookie in 2006
T = Tied 
 The player retained his European Tour card for 2007 (finished inside the top 118).
 The player did not retain his European Tour card for 2007, but retained conditional status (finished between 119–150).
 The player did not retain his European Tour card for 2007 (finished outside the top 150).

The players ranked 16th through 20th were placed below the Qualifying School graduates on the exemption list, and thus could improve their status by competing in Qualifying School. Tom Whitehouse and Ross Fisher both improved their status in this way, with Whitehouse medalling at Q School.

Winners on the European Tour in 2006

Runners-up on the European Tour in 2006

See also
2005 European Tour Qualifying School graduates
2006 European Tour

External links
Final ranking for 2005

Challenge Tour
European Tour
Challenge Tour Graduates
Challenge Tour Graduates